The Cavendish (or de Cavendish) family is a British noble family, of Anglo-Norman origins (though with an Anglo-Saxon name, originally from a place-name in Suffolk). They rose to their highest prominence as Duke of Devonshire and Duke of Newcastle.

Leading branches have held high offices in English and then in British politics, especially since the Glorious Revolution of 1688 and the participation of William Cavendish (then Earl of Devonshire) in the Invitation to William, though the family appears to date to the Norman Conquest of England, with Cavendish being used (in one form or another) as a surname  since the beginning of the 13th century. As a place-name, it is first recorded in 1086.

Early history 

The philosopher Thomas Hobbes was employed as a tutor by the Cavendish family and educated various members of the family.

From the Glorious Revolution onward 
After missing nation-leading and internationally definitive largesse and empire-building in Charles II's five-peer acronym of the Cabal ministry, William Cavendish, Earl of Devonshire, was the first of the name to rise to duke. He co-wrote the 1688 Invitation to William to exclude Catholics from the monarchy, which set in motion the Glorious Revolution in that year (and which also ultimately had the result of shifting more power to Parliament). The Invitation's authors were later known as "the Immortal Seven". This pre-dated the Spencer-Churchills' centrality under campaigns (most of all the Battle of Culloden) against the Catholic pretenders to the throne.

High appointments were often won by senior title holders and some juniors among the Cavendishes, from 1688 until about 1887, and marked the family's ascendancy, along with the Marquesses of Salisbury and the Earls of Derby. The notable lines descend from Sir John of Cavendish in the county of Suffolk (c. 1346–1381). Other peerages included the Dukedom of Newcastle; Barony of Waterpark (County Cork, Ireland); the Barony of Chesham (in Buckinghamshire); and through a daughter marrying into the Bentinck family (leading to combined surnames), the Dukedom of Portland (a title which ceased in 1990, and most of the wealth of which is in the Howard de Walden Estate, which has kept minor, overarching interests in and reviews changes across most of central Marylebone, London).

Concessions to populists of post-imperial meritocracy movements shifted power to industrialism and to the House of Commons. The 1911, 1958, 1963, and 1999 transformations of the House of Lords permanently ended key influence by Cavendish and many other British noble families.  Under primogeniture, the senior branches of these families still dominate in inter-family (relative) wealth and titles.

The head of the modern family is Peregrine Cavendish, 12th Duke of Devonshire, whose Georgian mansion, Chatsworth House, in the Peak District attracts many visitors with its gardens, iconic high-jet fountain, Capability Brown grounds, and fine-art collection.  Among its past urban assets with lasting influence, this branch of the family had a large house in London, on which many grand apartments and houses now stand, including Devonshire Square.

The family seat is Chatsworth House, a Grade I listed property, in Edensor, near Bakewell, which is owned as part of the Chatsworth Estate. According to the Estate website, "Chatsworth is very much home to the 12th Duke and Duchess, [who] are intensely involved in the day to day running of the business and upkeep of" the House. This area has been the home of the Cavendish family since 1549.

Notable members

 Sir John Cavendish  (c.1346–1381)
 Sir John Cavendish
 William Cavendish (died 1433)
 Thomas Cavendish (died 1477)
 Thomas Cavendish (died 1524)
 George Cavendish (1500–c.1562), English writer, biographer of Cardinal Wolsey
 William Cavendish
 Michael Cavendish (c.1565–1628), English composer
 William Cavendish (1505–1557), English courtier; married to Bess of Hardwick
 Henry Cavendish (1550–1616)
 Henry Cavendish (died 1624), illegitimate son
 Francis Cavendish (1618–1650)
 Henry Cavendish (1649–1698)
 William Cavendish (1682–1698)
 Sir Henry Cavendish, 1st Baronet (1707–1776), Anglo-Irish politician
 Sir Henry Cavendish, 2nd Baronet (1732–1804), Anglo-Irish politician; married to Sarah Cavendish, 1st Baroness Waterpark (1740–1807)
 Richard Cavendish, 2nd Baron Waterpark (1765–1830)
 Henry Cavendish, 3rd Baron Waterpark (1793–1863), MP
 Henry Anson Cavendish, 4th Baron Waterpark (1839–1912), sportsman
 Richard Cavendish (1794–1876), MP, member of the Canterbury Association
 George Cavendish (1766–1849), MP
 Augustus Cavendish-Bradshaw (1768–1832), MP
 William Cavendish, 1st Earl of Devonshire (1552–1626)
 William Cavendish, 2nd Earl of Devonshire (c. 1590–1628)
 William Cavendish, 3rd Earl of Devonshire (1617–1684)
 William Cavendish, 1st Duke of Devonshire (1640–1707)
 William Cavendish, 2nd Duke of Devonshire (1672–1729)
 William Cavendish, 3rd Duke of Devonshire (1698–1755), Lord Lieutenant of Ireland 1737–44
 William Cavendish, 4th Duke of Devonshire (1720–1764), briefly Prime Minister of Great Britain
 William Cavendish, 5th Duke of Devonshire (1748–1811); married firstly to Georgiana Cavendish, Duchess of Devonshire (1757–1806), political organizer; married secondly to Elizabeth Cavendish, Duchess of Devonshire (1758–1824)
 Georgiana Howard, Countess of Carlisle (1783–1858)
 Harriet Leveson-Gower, Countess Granville (1785–1862)
 William Cavendish, 6th Duke of Devonshire (1790–1858), Lord Chamberlain to King William IV. The Cavendish banana is named after him.
 Lady Dorothy Cavendish (1750–1794), Duchess of Portland, 3x great grandmother of Queen Elizabeth II
 Lord Richard Cavendish (1752–1781), MP
 George Augustus Henry Cavendish, 1st Earl of Burlington (1754–1834)
 William Cavendish (1783–1812)
 William Cavendish, 7th Duke of Devonshire (1808–91), Chancellor of the University of Cambridge 1861–91, for whom the Cavendish Laboratory is named
 Spencer Cavendish, 8th Duke of Devonshire (1833–1908), British Liberal statesman; married to Louisa Cavendish, Duchess of Devonshire (1832–1911), the "Double Duchess"
 Lord Frederick Cavendish (1836–1882), British Liberal politician; married to Lucy Cavendish (1841–1925), namesake of Lucy Cavendish College, Cambridge
 Lord Edward Cavendish (1838–1891), soldier and politician
 Victor Cavendish, 9th Duke of Devonshire (1868–1938), British politician, Governor General of Canada 1916–21; married to Evelyn Cavendish, Duchess of Devonshire (1870–1960), Mistress of the Robes to Queen Mary
 Edward Cavendish, 10th Duke of Devonshire (1895–1950), Minister in Winston Churchill's wartime cabinet; married to Mary Cavendish, Duchess of Devonshire (1895–1988), Mistress of the Robes to Elizabeth II
 William John Robert Cavendish, Marquess of Hartington (1917–1944), killed in action, Belgium; married to Kathleen Cavendish, Marchioness of Hartington aka Kick Kennedy (1920–1948), sister of U.S. president John F. Kennedy
 Andrew Cavendish, 11th Duke of Devonshire (1920–2004), British government minister; married to Deborah Cavendish, Duchess of Devonshire (1920–2014), Mitford sister and writer
 Peregrine Cavendish, 12th Duke of Devonshire (born 1944), horse racing devotee
 William Cavendish, Earl of Burlington aka Bill Burlington (born 1969), professional photographer
 Lord Richard Cavendish (1871–1946), author, magistrate and politician
 Richard Edward Osborne Cavendish (1917–1972)
 Hugh Cavendish, Baron Cavendish of Furness (born 1941)
 Lord George Henry Cavendish (1810–1880), British politician
 George Henry Compton Cavendish (1784–1809), English politician
 Henry Frederick Compton Cavendish (1789–1873), general
William Henry Frederick Cavendish (1817-1881)
Cecil Charles Cavendish (1855-1931)
Brigadier Ronald Valentine Cecil Cavendish (1896-1943)
Robin Francis Cavendish (1930-1994), disability rights activist
Jonathon Stewart Cavendish (b. 1959), film producer
 Charles Cavendish, 1st Baron Chesham (1793–1863), Liberal politician
 William Cavendish, 2nd Baron Chesham (1815–1882)
 Charles Cavendish, 3rd Baron Chesham (1850–1907)
 John Cavendish, 4th Baron Chesham (1894–1952)
 John Cavendish, 5th Baron Chesham (1916–1989)
 Nicholas Cavendish, 6th Baron Chesham (1941–2009)
 Charles Cavendish, 7th Baron Chesham (born 1974)
 Lord George Augustus Cavendish (c. 1727–1794), British politician
 Lord Frederick Cavendish (1729–1803), field marshal
 Lord John Cavendish (1734–1796), English politician
 Lord James Cavendish (1701–1741)
 Lord Charles Cavendish (1704–1783)
 Henry Cavendish (1731–1810) scientist, known for the Cavendish experiment
 Lord Henry Cavendish (1673–1700)
 Lord James Cavendish (c. 1678–1751), married to Anne Yale (died 1734), daughter of Elihu Yale
 Sir Charles Cavendish (c. 1553–1617)
 William Cavendish, 1st Duke of Newcastle (1592–1676), English soldier, politician and writer; married to Margaret Cavendish, Duchess of Newcastle (1623–1673), English writer and scientist
 Jane Cavendish (1621–1669), poet and playwright
 Charles Cavendish, Viscount Mansfield (c. 1626–1659)
 Henry Cavendish, 2nd Duke of Newcastle (1630–1691)
 Elizabeth Monck, Duchess of Albemarle (1654–1734)
 Henry Cavendish, Earl of Ogle (1659–1680), first husband of Elizabeth Seymour, Duchess of Somerset
 Margaret Holles, Duchess of Newcastle-upon-Tyne (1661–1716)
Henrietta Harley, Countess of Oxford (1694–1755)
Margaret Bentinck, Duchess of Portland (1715–1785)
William Cavendish-Bentinck, 3rd Duke of Portland (1738–1809), ancestor of the Cavendish-Bentinck family
Cavendish-Bentinck family
 Elizabeth Egerton, Countess of Bridgwater (1626–1663), writer
 Sir Charles Cavendish (c. 1594–1654), MP

The explorer Thomas Cavendish "the Navigator" (1555–1592) was descended from Roger Cavendish, Sir John Cavendish's brother.

The 3rd to 9th Dukes of Portland were descended from the Cavendish family through the female line, and took the surname Cavendish-Bentinck or a variant thereof. Their principal seat, Welbeck Abbey in Nottinghamshire, came to them through the Cavendish connection.

References

Charles Roger Dod, Peerage, Baronetage, and Knightage, Volume 15 (S. Low, Marston & Company, 1855), 544. 
William Courthope, Debrett's Complete Peerage of the United Kingdom of Great Britain and Ireland (J. G. & F. Rivington, 1838), 18.
Sir Egerton Brydges, A Biographical Peerage of the Empire of Great Britain (J. Johnson, 1808), 86.

 
Political families of the United Kingdom
Noble families of the United Kingdom